The Répudre Aqueduct is the first aqueduct built on the Canal du Midi.  Pierre-Paul Riquet designed it to cross the Répudre River.  It was built by Emmanuel d'Estan.  It was designed in 1675 and completed in 1676, but was severely  damaged that winter and had to be rebuilt. It is one of three original aqueducts created by Pierre-Paul Riquet during the building of the canal from 1667 to 1681.

References

External links
 Photo of side.
 Entering the Aquduct.
 Some history and photos.

Aqueducts on Canal du Midi